Trey Fanjoy is an American music video director. Fanjoy has directed over 150 major label music videos. Her videos have appeared on CMT, VH1, GAC, The Nashville Network, CMT Canada, and MTV. She is the first woman to win the Country Music Association Award for Video of the Year and, to date, the only woman to win the award twice and one of two people to win the award three times.

Biography
Trey Fanjoy was born in North Carolina. She moved to Los Angeles in the 1980s to pursue a career in acting, and worked as a waitress to support herself financially while doing so. At this point she also took an interest in directing and moved to Nashville, Tennessee, where she lived with songwriter Tammy Hyler. In the meantime, Fanjoy worked as a receptionist at RCA Records Nashville, where she was consulted by Jon Randall's manager Monty Hitchcock to correct the lighting on Randall's music video "I Came Straight to You". Hyler introduced Fanjoy to music video director Jon Small, who selected her as producer on videos that he directed. Fanjoy made her directorial debut in 1997 with the video for "Heart Hold On" by The Buffalo Club. From there, she went on to direct videos for Lonestar, Keith Urban, and Billy Gilman among others.

Awards

Videos directed

222 music videos are currently listed here.

References

External links
 

Advertising directors
American music video directors
Grammy Award winners
Living people
Place of birth missing (living people)
Year of birth missing (living people)
Female music video directors